Gangrene  is a severe medical condition caused by infection or a critically insufficient blood supply.

Gangrene may also refer to:
Gangrene (album), a 2008 album by Mirrorthrone
Gangrene (book), a 1976 novel by Jef Geeraerts
Gangrene (group), an American hip hop production duo

See also

Gang Green (disambiguation)